Samsi College is an undergraduate college at Samsi under Chanchol police station in the Malda district of West Bengal, India. The college is affiliated to the University of Gour Banga, offering undergraduate courses.

History 

This is the second oldest Higher educational institute in the Malda district and primarily organized by the then President and District Magistrate of Maldah, Mr. Kamalakar Mishra (I.A.S.) in 1967. People living in and around Samsi donated money and land to establish the college. In 1968 the college formally opened, with classes at Samsi Agril High School. Within two years of its establishment, the college was able to construct its own temporary mud-building at the present site in the Kandaran area. There are two well-protected boys' and girls' hostels for the students who live some distance away.

Departments

Arts and Commerce

Bengali 
English
Arabic
Sanskrit
History
Political Science
Philosophy
Commerce
Geography

See also

References

External links
Samsi College
University of Gour Banga
University Grants Commission
National Assessment and Accreditation Council

Universities and colleges in Malda district
Colleges affiliated to University of Gour Banga
Educational institutions established in 1968
1968 establishments in West Bengal
Academic institutions formerly affiliated with the University of North Bengal